Tuvalu competed at the 2020 Summer Olympics in Tokyo, which were held from 23 July to 8 August 2021. Originally scheduled to take place from 24 July to 9 August 2020, the event was postponed due to the COVID-19 pandemic. Their participation marked their fourth consecutive appearance at the Summer Olympics since their debut at the 2008 Summer Olympics. The Tuvaluan delegation consisted of the sprinters Karalo Maibuca and Matie Stanley, both of whom were competing in their first Olympics. Neither Maibuca nor Stanley managed to progress beyond the preliminary rounds of their events, although Maibuca set a Tuvaluan national record of 11.42 seconds in the men's 100 metres.

Background 
Tuvalu is an island country located in Polynesia in the Pacific Ocean. Formerly a colony of the United Kingdom, it gained independence in 1978. The Tuvalu Association of Sports and National Olympic Committee was formed in 2004, and was recognized by the International Olympic Committee in 2007. Tuvalu first participated in the Summer Olympics in 2008, and have appeared in two more Summer Olympics before the 2020 Summer Olympics. However, they have never won an Olympic medal.

The 2020 Summer Olympics were originally due to be held from 24 July to 9 August 2020, but were delayed to 23 July to 8 August 2021 due to the COVID-19 pandemic. For the 2020 Summer Olympics, Tuvalu sent a delegation of two athletes, one of 13 countries to do so. The athletes were the sprinters Karalo Maibuca and Matie Stanley, who competed in the men's and women's 100 metres, respectively. Stanley and Maibuca respectively were the female and male flag bearers during the opening ceremony, while Maibuca was the flag bearer during the closing ceremony.

Athletics

Tuvalu received a universality slot (a quota allowing nations to send athletes if no one has qualified for the event) from the International Olympic Committee to send two athletes in athletics, one male and one female, to the Olympics. It chose to send 22 year-old Karalo Maibuca and 18 year-old Matie Stanley, both of whom were participating in their first Olympics.

Maibuca finished ninth in his heat and did not advance past the preliminary round, but set a new Tuvaluan national record of 11.42 seconds. Stanley finished eighth out of nine runners in her heat and also did not advance past the preliminary round, setting a personal best time of 14.52 seconds.

Track & road events

See also 
 Tuvalu at the Olympics

References

Olympics
Nations at the 2020 Summer Olympics
2020